Bhartṛhari (also romanised as Bhartrihari; fl. c. 5th century CE) was a Hindu linguistic philosopher to whom are normally ascribed two influential Sanskrit texts:

 the Trikāṇḍī (including Vākyapadīya), on Sanskrit grammar and linguistic philosophy, a foundational text in the Indian grammatical tradition, explaining numerous theories on the word and on the sentence, including theories which came to be known under the name of Sphoṭa; in this work Bhartrhari also discussed logical problems such as the liar paradox and a paradox of unnameability or unsignifiability which has become known as Bhartrhari's paradox, and 
 the Śatakatraya, a work of Sanskrit poetry, comprising three collections of about 100 stanzas each; it may or may not be by the same author who composed the two mentioned grammatical works.

In the medieval tradition of Indian scholarship, it was assumed that both texts were written by the same person. 
Modern philologists were sceptical of this claim, owing to an argument that dated the grammar to a date subsequent to the poetry. Since the 1990s, however, scholars have agreed that both works may indeed have been contemporary, in which case it is plausible that there was only one Bhartrihari who wrote both texts.

Both the grammar and the poetic works had an enormous influence in their respective fields. 
The grammar in particular, takes a holistic view of language, countering the compositionality position of the Mimamsakas and others.

According to Aithihyamala, he is also credited with some other texts like Harikītika and Amaru Shataka.

The poetry constitute short verses, collected into three centuries of about a hundred poems each. Each century deals with a different rasa or aesthetic mood; on the whole his poetic work has been very highly regarded both within the tradition and by modern scholarship.

The name Bhartrihari is also sometimes associated with Bhartrihari traya Shataka, the legendary king of Ujjaini in the 1st century.

Date and identity

The account of the Chinese traveller Yi-Jing indicates that Bhartrihari's grammar was known by 670 CE, and that he may have been Buddhist, which the poet was not.  Based on this, scholarly opinion had formerly attributed the grammar to a separate author of the same name from the 7th century CE.  However, other evidence indicates a much earlier date:

A period of  450–500 "definitely not later than 425–450", or, following Erich Frauwallner, 450–510 or perhaps 400 CE or even earlier.

Yi-Jing's other claim, that Bhartrihari was a Buddhist, does not seem to hold; his philosophical position is widely held to be an offshoot of the Vyakarana or grammarian school, closely allied to the realism of the Naiyayikas and distinctly opposed to Buddhist positions like Dignaga, who are closer to phenomenalism.  It is also opposed to other Mimamsakas like Kumarila Bhatta.  However, some of his ideas subsequently influenced some Buddhist schools, which may have led Yi-Jing to surmise that he may have been Buddhist.

Thus, on the whole it seems likely that the traditional Sanskritist view, that the poet of the Śatakatraya is the same as the grammarian Bhartṛhari, may be accepted.

The leading Sanskrit scholar Ingalls (1968) submitted that "I see no reason why he should not have written poems as well as grammar and metaphysics", like Dharmakirti, Shankaracharya, and many others. Yi Jing himself appeared to think they were the same person, as he wrote that (the grammarian) Bhartṛhari, author of the Vakyapadiya, was renowned for his vacillation between Buddhist monkhood and a life of pleasure, and for having written verses on the subject.

Vākyapadīya

Bhartrihari's views on language build on that of earlier grammarians such as Patanjali, but were quite radical.  A key element of his conception of language is the notion of sphoṭa – a term that may be based on an ancient grammarian, Sphoṭāyana, referred by Pāṇini, now lost.

In his Mahabhashya, Patanjali (2nd century BCE) uses the term sphoṭa to denote the sound of language, the universal, while the actual sound (dhvani) may be long or short, or vary in other ways.  This distinction may be thought to be similar to that of the present notion of phoneme.  Bhatrihari however, applies the term sphota to each element of the utterance, varṇa the letter or syllable, pada the word, and vākya the sentence.  To create the linguistic invariant, he argues that these must be treated as separate wholes (varṇasphoṭa, padasphoṭa and vākyasphoṭa respectively).  For example, the same speech sound or varṇa may have different properties in different word contexts (e.g. assimilation), so that the sound cannot be discerned until the whole word is heard.

Further, Bhartrihari argues for a sentence-holistic view of meaning, saying that the meaning of an utterance is known only after the entire sentence (vākyasphoṭa) has been received, and it is not composed from the individual atomic elements or linguistic units which may change their interpretation based on later elements in the utterance.  Further, words are understood only in the context of the sentence whose meaning as a whole is known.  His argument for this was based on language acquisition, e.g. consider a child observing the exchange below:

elder adult (uttama-vṛddha "full-grown"): says "bring the horse"
younger adult (madhyama-vṛddha "half-grown"): reacts by bringing the horse

The child observing this may now learn that the unit "horse" refers to the animal.  Unless the child knew the sentence meaning a priori, it would be difficult for him to infer the meaning of novel words.  Thus, we grasp the sentence meaning as a whole, and reach words as parts of the sentence, and word meanings as parts of the sentence meaning through "analysis, synthesis and abstraction" (apoddhāra).

The sphoṭa theory was influential, but it was opposed by many others.  Later Mimamsakas like Kumarila Bhatta (c. 650 CE) strongly rejected the vākyasphoṭa view, and argued for the denotative power of each word, arguing for the composition of meanings (abhihitānvaya).  The Prabhakara school (c. 670) among Mimamsakas however took a less atomistic position, arguing that word meanings exist, but are determined by context (anvitābhidhāna).

In a section of the chapter on Relation Bhartrhari discusses the liar paradox and identifies a hidden parameter which turns an unproblematic situation in daily life into a stubborn paradox. In addition, Bhartrhari discusses here a paradox that has been called "Bhartrhari's paradox" by Hans and Radhika Herzberger. This paradox arises from the statement "this is unnameable" or "this is unsignifiable".

The Mahābhāṣya-dīpikā (also Mahābhāṣya-ṭīkā) is an early subcommentary on Patanjali's Vyākaraṇa-Mahābhāṣya, also attributed to Bhartṛhari.

Śatakatraya

Bhartrihari's poetry is aphoristic, and comments on the social mores of the time.  The collected work is known as  "the three  or 'hundreds' ('centuries')", consisting of three thematic compilations on shringara, vairagya and niti (loosely: love, dispassion and moral conduct) of hundred verses each.

Unfortunately, the extant manuscript versions of these s vary widely in the verses included.   D.D. Kosambi has identified a kernel of two hundred that are common to all the versions.

Here is a sample that comments on social mores:

And here is one dealing with the theme of love:
 The clear bright flame of a man's discernment dies
 When a girl clouds it with her lamp-black eyes. [Bhartrihari #77, tr. John Brough; poem 167]

Bhartrhari's paradox
Bhartrhari's paradox is the title of a 1981 paper by Hans and Radhika Herzberger which drew attention to the discussion  of self-referential paradoxes in the work Vākyapadīya attributed to Bhartṛhari.

In the chapter dealing with logical and linguistic relations, the Sambandha-samuddeśa, Bhartrhari discusses several statements of a paradoxical nature, including sarvam mithyā bravīmi "everything I am saying is false" which belongs to the liar paradox family, as well as the paradox arising from the statement that something is unnameable or unsignifiable (in Sanskrit: avācya): this becomes nameable or signifiable precisely by calling it unnameable or unsignifiable. When applied to integers, the latter is known today as Berry paradox.

Bhartrhari's interest lies not in strengthening this and other paradoxes by abstracting them from pragmatic context, but rather in exploring how a stubborn paradox may arise from unproblematic situations in daily communication.

An unproblematic situation of communication is turned into a paradox — we have either contradiction (virodha) or infinite regress (anavasthā) — when abstraction is made from the signification and its extension in time, by accepting a simultaneous, opposite function (apara vyāpāra) undoing the previous one.

For Bhartrhari it is important to analyse and solve the unsignifiability paradox because he holds that what cannot be signified may nevertheless be indicated (vyapadiśyate) and it may be understood (pratīyate) to exist.

Works 

Works attributed to Bhartr-hari include:

 Trikāṇḍī ("three books"), sometimes known under the inaccurate title Vakyapadiya
 The author wrote the commentaries (vṛttis) on the first two books, and probably died before he could do it for the third book. The title Trikāṇḍī was probably not chosen by the author, who originally conceived them as "relatively independent" works, but later thought of unifying them.
 Tripadi, also known as Mahabhashya-tika or Mahabhashya-dipika
 The earliest commentators on the text call it Tripadi, and the title Mahabhashya-dipika is known only from one manuscript.
 The author probably intended to write a commentary on the entire text, but died after completing the work on the three padas of Maha-bhashya. The title Tripadi was probably coined by someone other than the author.
 The currently surviving version of the work covers only the first seven ahnikas of hte first pada of Mahabhashya. It is known from a fragmentary manuscript.
 Shabda-dhatu-samiksha, now lost
 This work is attributed to Bharthari by the Kashmiri Shaivite authors Soma-nanda and Utpalacharya (9th-10th centuries). According to Utpalacharya, in this work, Bharthari described the concept of pashyanti, which he also discusses in the Trikandi.
 Possibly, a commentary on Jaimini's Mimamsa Sutras

Tradition also attributes several other works to "Bharthari", although the authenticity of such attributions is doubtful. For example, tradition identifies Bharthari the grammarian with the poet who composed Subhashita-tri-shati, a work said to contain 300 stanzas. However, the number of stanzas in the surviving text is much more than 300, which complicates the identification of its actual author.

See also
Regarding Bhartrhari's paradox, see:
B. K. Matilal, 1990, The Word and the World: India's Contribution to the Study of Language. Delhi: Oxford University Press. p. 129-130.
Hemanta Kumar Ganguli, "Theory of Logical Construction and Solution of some Logical Paradoxes" , appendix  to  Philosophy of Logical Construction: An Examination of Logical Atomism and Logical Positivism in the light of the Philosophies of Bhartrhari, Dharmakirti and Prajnakaragupta, Calcutta, 1963.
Jan E.M. Houben, The Sambandha-samuddeśa (chapter on relation) and Bhartrhari's philosophy of language, Gonda Indological Series, 2. Groningen: Egbert Forsten, 1995, pp. 213–219.

References

Bibliography

External links

 Bhartrihari (c. 450—510 C.E.) in the Internet Encyclopedia of Philosophy
 Bibliography on Bhartṛhari, Grammarian and Philosopher
 
  "Tracking the Hermit's Soul: A Jungian Reading Of Bhartrihari's Satakatraya" by Mathew V. Spano 

Sanskrit grammarians
Sanskrit poets
Indian male poets
Ancient Sanskrit grammarians
5th-century Indian poets
Indian Sanskrit scholars